Wendy Jo Smith, better known as her stage-name Wendy Ho, is an American rap-artist, singer, and comedian.

Early life and career 

Smith was born in Toledo, Ohio, and spent much of her childhood in Kansas City, Kansas. She moved to New York City in the summer of 2002, where she participated in the cabaret scene and performed in regional theatre shows. She acquired the nickname "Wendy Ho" while attending college at Southwest Missouri State University, where she was the recipient of the Kathleen Turner Performance Scholarship.

Smith began her career in the comedy clubs of New York, eventually playing a Christmas show at a gay-oriented venue. From that point forward she began focusing much of her act on gay audiences. The persona used in the act used her college nickname "Wendy Ho", which has been described as a parody of a prostitute from Harlem as well as a "female drag queen". Her act contains both stand-up comedy, rap performances, and singing. She has stated that she uses the word "Ho" in her stage name in order to reclaim the word from its negative connotations.

Entertainment career 

Smith's first release was the rap album The Gospel According to Ho, for which the music video for the track Bitch, I Stole Yo' Purse was produced. The video earned its way into circulation on the cable music video channel Logo TV. Logo viewers voted the video the "ultimate funniest video in February 2008. The television series Nip/Tuck also hired Jennifer Coolidge to play a parody of the Wendy Ho persona called "Hot Coco", who sings a song titled Yo Stank from an album titled The Gospel According to Coco (the name of which parodies the title of Smith's first album). After the performance Coolidge stated "Wendy Ho is about as cool as it gets. I'd never seen anything like her."

The song Fuck Me became a favorite among drag queens in the United States, who began commonly performing to the song after its release. Smith later released a remixed version of the song on her album Number 2 in the summer of 2010 and released her second full album Yes, I'm a Ho! in October 2010. Television appearances for Smith have included her appearance on the Showtime series I Can't Believe I'm Still Single. In 2014, her album Greatest Shits entered the Billboard Comedy Album top 10 chart, hitting number eight for the November 1, 2014 list.

References

External links 
 Official website  
 Bitch, I Stole Yo' Purse music video on MTV

Singers from Ohio
Missouri State University alumni
American women comedians
American stand-up comedians
Rappers from Ohio
Musicians from Toledo, Ohio
Living people
Musicians from Kansas City, Kansas
Comedians from Ohio
21st-century American rappers
Year of birth missing (living people)
21st-century American women